The William H. White House, at 510 N. 100 East in Beaver, Utah, is a historic house built around 1882.  It was listed on the National Register of Historic Places in 1984.

It is a one-and-a-half-story house on a black rock foundation.  It was later extended to the rear with an addition that made the house T-shaped.

The property also includes a black rock granary.

References

Houses on the National Register of Historic Places in Utah
Victorian architecture in Utah
Houses completed in 1882
Beaver County, Utah